The 2010 Euro Beach Soccer Cup was the twelfth Euro Beach Soccer Cup, one of Europe's three major beach soccer championships of the 2010 beach soccer season, held in June 2010, in Rome, Italy, for the second year in a row.
Russia won the championship for the first time, with six time champions Portugal finishing second. Italy beat last year's champions Spain in the third place playoff, ending their run of two consecutive titles, to finish third and fourth respectively.

Eight teams participated in the tournament who played in a straightforward knockout tournament, starting with the quarterfinals, with extra matches deciding the nations who finished in fifth, sixth, seventh and eighth place.

Participating nations

Matches

Main tournament

Fifth to eighth place deciding matches
The following matches took place between the losing nations in the quarterfinals to determine the final standings of the nations finishing in fifth to eighth place. The semifinals took place on the same day of the semifinals of the main tournament and the playoffs took place on the day of the final.

Winners

Final standings

References

Euro Beach Soccer Cup
2010 in beach soccer
June 2010 sports events in Italy